Lyapunovo is a rural locality (a selo) in Shadrukhinsky Selsoviet, Uglovsky District, Altai Krai, Russia. The population was 127 as of 2013. It was founded in 1864. There are 2 streets.

Geography 
Lyapunovo is located 11 km south of Uglovskoye (the district's administrative centre) by road. Uglovskoye is the nearest rural locality.

References 

Rural localities in Uglovsky District, Altai Krai